This is a list of notable racquetball players. 

Racquetball players are presumed to be notable under the following criteria. 

1. The player has finished a season ranked in the top 10 of the men’s or women’s pro tours (i.e., the International Racquetball Tour or Ladies Professional Racquetball Tour).
2. The player has represented their country at an open level international event (e.g., the Racquetball World Championships, Pan American Racquetball Championships, Pan American Games, etc.) 
3. The player is a member of the USA Racquetball Hall of Fame.

Male

Female

References

Racquetball players